Karl Wyss (9 April 1912 – 6 December 2009) was a Swiss racing cyclist. He rode in the 1939 Tour de France.

References

1912 births
2009 deaths
Swiss male cyclists
Place of birth missing